Aghuzbon Kand Sar (also Romanized as Āghūzbon Kand Sar; also known as Āghūzbon Kandeh and Āghūzbon Kandeh Sar) is a village in Eshkevar-e Sofla Rural District, Rahimabad District, Rudsar County, Gilan Province, Iran. At the 2006 census, its population was 391, in 102 families.

References 

Populated places in Rudsar County